The Socialist Party of Labour (PSM) was a left wing-nationalist political party in Romania. The party was labelled as neo-communist. It was founded on 16 November 1990. The chairman of the party was Ilie Verdeţ, former Communist Prime Minister between 1979 and 1982, under Secretary General Nicolae Ceaușescu.

At the 1992 general election, the party obtained roughly 3% of votes and thus entered the parliament. Together with the Greater Romania Party (PRM), the PSM formed the "National Bloc" faction in the Romanian Senate. The PSM participated in the so-called Red Quadrilateral coalition that included Iliescu's Democratic National Salvation Front (FDSN), the Greater Romania Party (PRM; at that time national communist), the Agrarian Democracy Party (PDAR), and the nationalist Romanian National Unity Party (PUNR). 

Later, the Socialist Party of Labour (PSM) gradually lost its influence. In July 2003, the party fused with the Social Democratic Party (PSD); members who objected to the fusion formed a splinter group, called the Socialist Alliance Party (PSR).

Electoral history

Legislative elections

Presidential elections

References

External links
 Parties, Poles, Alliances and Romanian Pluralism, 1990-2000 by Maxmilián Strmiska

1990 establishments in Romania
2003 disestablishments in Romania
Communist parties in Romania
Defunct communist parties
Defunct nationalist parties
Defunct socialist parties in Romania
Far-left political parties
Far-left politics in Romania
Left-wing nationalist parties
Left-wing parties in Romania
Nationalist parties in Romania
Political parties disestablished in 2003
Political parties established in 1990
Romanian nationalist parties